Mark Lehman Strauss is an American biblical scholar and professor of the New Testament at Bethel Seminary San Diego, which is part of Bethel University, Minnesota. His areas of expertise include New Testament Gospels and Bible translation.

Background and education
Strauss earned his B.A. from Westmont College, his M.Div and Th.M. from Talbot School of Theology, and his Ph.D. in New Testament from University of Aberdeen.

Prior to joining the faculty at Bethel Seminary in 1993, Strauss taught at Biola University, Christian Heritage College, and Talbot School of Theology. He has also served on the Committee on Bible Translation for the New International Version since 2005.

Strauss is married to his wife Roxanne, a marriage and family therapist; together they have three children.

Selected works

Books
 - a revision of his PhD thesis

Edited

Chapters and articles

References

Living people
American biblical scholars
New Testament scholars
Translators of the Bible into English
Westmont College alumni
Talbot School of Theology alumni
Alumni of the University of Aberdeen
Bethel University (Minnesota) faculty
Biola University faculty
Year of birth missing (living people)